Biougra (Amazigh: Biygwra, ⴱⵉⵢⴳⵯⵔⴰ; Moroccan Arabic: Biyūgrā ) is a town in Chtouka Aït Baha Province, Souss-Massa, Morocco. According to the 2014 census it has a population of 37,933.

Album Photos

References

Populated places in Chtouka Aït Baha Province
Municipalities of Morocco
Biougra